"Tomorrow" is a single from the second album, also titled Tomorrow, by the American rock band SR-71. The song was a change from the pop punk focus of their first album, Now You See Inside, as part of "a conscious effort to write a lot of positive songs", according to singer Mitch Allan. The song peaked at 18 at the Billboard Modern Rock Tracks chart.

Charts

References

2002 singles
2002 songs
SR-71 (band) songs
RCA Records singles
Song recordings produced by Mitch Allan
Song recordings produced by Butch Walker
Songs written by Mitch Allan
Nu metal songs